Brahm Dutt (27 March 1926 – 5 October 2014) was an Indian politician and a member of the 8th Lok Sabha & 9th Lok Sabha. He represented the Tehri Garhwal Lok Sabha Constituency and was a member of the Congress political party. He was also elected to the 8th Assembly of Uttar Pradesh from Mussoorie Assembly constituency.

Positions held

References

 http://164.100.47.194/loksabha/writereaddata/biodata_1_12/2991.htm

1926 births
Indian National Congress politicians from Uttar Pradesh
People from Dehradun district
India MPs 1984–1989
India MPs 1989–1991
Lok Sabha members from Uttar Pradesh
Uttar Pradesh MLAs 1980–1985
2014 deaths